Events in the year 2018 in Qatar.

Incumbents
 Emir: Tamim bin Hamad Al Thani

Events
25 October to 5 November – The 2018 World Artistic Gymnastics Championships were held in Doha.

14 to 18 December – The 2018 WPA World Nine-ball Championship were held in Doha.

Deaths

14 October – Abdulaziz Jassim, actor and comedian (born 1957).

References

 

 
2010s in Qatar
Years of the 21st century in Qatar
Qatar
Qatar